The Frank Anthony Public School (often abbreviated as 'FAPS') is a public day-school in New Delhi, India, for students ranging from 3–18 years.
The school is coeducational and has more than 3600 boys and girls on the rolls from classes Nursery, Preparatory up to Class XII.

History
The school was founded in 1959 by Mr. Frank Anthony who was a member of the Indian constituent assembly and represented the Anglo-Indian community. He was also the Founder-Chairman of the All India Anglo-Indian Educational Trust which, today, owns and administers five schools named after him, including The Frank Anthony Public School, New Delhi, The Frank Anthony Public School, Bengaluru, The Frank Anthony Public School, Kolkata and three Frank Anthony Junior Schools in the cities of Bangalore, Kolkata and Delhi. The four school buildings in Delhi were designed by the German architect Mr. Heinz, are located at Lajpat Nagar - 4, adjacent to the Lady Shri Ram College.

The school is established, owned and administered by the All-India Anglo-Indian Education Institution, New Delhi, registered under the Societies Registration Act XXI of 1860. It is affiliated to the Council for the Indian School Certificate Examinations (ICSE) (the only one in New Delhi), which was established by the late Mr. Frank Anthony in 1958 in liaison with the Cambridge Syndicate and continued as the elected Chairman till his demise in December 1993.

The school is divided into four sections i.e., the Nursery Section, the Junior Section, the Middle Section and  the Senior Section. Students of classes 11 and 12 are divided into three sections: Science (English, Physics, Chemistry, Mathematics/Computer, Biology/Computer Applications/Economics), Commerce (English, Commerce, Accounts, Economics, Sociology/Second Language) and Humanities (English, Literature in English, second language, History, Sociology, Political Science).

This school is famous for its discipline and quality of teachers.

Notable alumni

 Shimon Sharif, International Shooter, Limca Book Record Holder
 Nicolette Bird, actress, model
 Rana Kapoor, CEO, YES Bank
 Kshama Metre, National Director, Chinmaya Organization for Rural Development (CORD) and a Padma Shri awardee
 Siddhartha Basu, an Indian television producer-director and quiz show host, widely regarded as the "Father of Indian television quizzing".
Lieutenant General Vinod G. Khandare, Military Advisor to the National Security Council Secretariat of India

See also
The Frank Anthony Public School, Bangalore
The Frank Anthony Public School, Kolkata

References

Schools in Delhi
New Delhi
1959 establishments in Delhi
Educational institutions established in 1959